The 2017 Atlantic Coast Conference men's basketball tournament was the postseason men's basketball tournament for the Atlantic Coast Conference and was held at Barclays Center in Brooklyn, New York from March 7 to 11, 2017. Duke became the first team in history to win four straight games in the ACC Tournament and received the conference's automatic bid to the 2017 NCAA tournament with a 75–69 win over Notre Dame.

Seeds
All 15 ACC teams participated in the tournament. The top nine teams receive first-round byes and the top four teams received double-byes to the quarterfinals. Teams were seeded by record within the conference, with a tiebreaker system to seed teams with identical conference records.

Schedule
All games on ACC Network

Bracket

Awards and honors 
Tournament MVP: Luke Kennard, Duke

All-Tournament Teams:

First Team
 Luke Kennard, Duke
 Jayson Tatum, Duke
 Bonzie Colson, Notre Dame
 Matt Farrell, Notre Dame
 Isaiah Hicks, North Carolina

Second Team
 Grayson Allen, Duke
 Frank Jackson, Duke
 Amile Jefferson, Duke
 Steve Vasturia, Notre Dame
 Zach LeDay, Virginia Tech

See also

 2017 ACC women's basketball tournament

References

Tournament
ACC men's basketball tournament
Basketball competitions in New York City
College basketball tournaments in New York (state)
Sports in Brooklyn
ACC men's basketball tournament
ACC men's basketball tournament
2010s in Brooklyn
Prospect Heights, Brooklyn